The Museum of Urban Civilization (in Romanian: Muzeul Civilizației Urbane) is a museum in Brașov, Romania.

The museum is located on the south side of the Piața Sfatului, the main historic square of the city.
To the north in the centre of the square is the Brașov County Museum of History and to the southwest is the Black Church.

See also
 Brașov County Museum of History

References

External links
 Museum of Urban Civilization website

2009 establishments in Romania
Museums established in 2009
History museums in Romania
Tourist attractions in Brașov
Buildings and structures in Brașov
Museums in Brașov County
Piața Sfatului